Tozghi Railway Station (Balochi:توزگھئی ریلوے اسٹیشن ) is  located in Tozghi, Balochistan, Pakistan.

See also
 List of railway stations in Pakistan
 Pakistan Railways

References

External links

Railway stations on Quetta–Taftan Railway Line
Railway stations in Balochistan, Pakistan